The Dayton Falcons were a USA Hockey-sanctioned Tier III junior ice hockey team that competed in the North American 3 Hockey League (NA3HL). The team was based in Centerville, Ohio, a suburb of Dayton, Ohio, and the team's home ice was South Metro Sports.

Franchise history 

The team was previously known as the Queen City Steam from 2007 to 2013 after replacing the former Cincinnati Jr. Cyclones that had folded at the end of the previous season. In 2013, the Steam re-branded as the Cincinnati Swords after the merger of two youth hockey programs in the Cincinnati area. The Swords name is a homage to the former American Hockey League team of the same name. On August 14, 2014, the NA3HL approved the sale of the Cincinnati Swords to the Miami Valley Hockey Association owned by Ryan and Jim Colville.

On April 10, 2015, the Swords announced that it would be renamed and called the Cincinnati Thunder beginning with the 2015–16 season. On June 2, 2015 the Thunder announced that they will be playing out of the historic Cincinnati Gardens for the 2015–16 season. With the sale and closing of the Cincinnati Gardens in the summer of 2016, the team began playing home games at South Metro Sports in Centerville, Ohio, near Dayton, Ohio, for the 2016–17 season. In 2017, the team stayed at South Metro and rebranded as the Dayton Falcons. After 11 games into the season with only one win using a team of about ten skaters, the team forfeited its twelfth game and was removed from the NA3HL schedule.

Season-by-season records

References

External links 
 Cincinnati Thunder Website
 Official NA3HL Website

Ice hockey teams in Ohio
Sports teams in Cincinnati
2007 establishments in Ohio
Ice hockey clubs established in 2007
2017 disestablishments in Ohio
Ice hockey clubs disestablished in 2017
Sports teams in Dayton, Ohio